Bendy may refer to:

 A bend in heraldry
 Bendy, a character from the episodic puzzle horror video game Bendy and the Ink Machine
 Bendy (franchise), a series of games including and related to Bendy and the Ink Machine
 Bendy, a character from the American animated television series Foster's Home for Imaginary Friends
 Bendy, a character from the puzzle game Portal 2